George Mountbatten may refer to:

 George Mountbatten, 2nd Marquess of Milford Haven (1892–1938)
 George Mountbatten, 4th Marquess of Milford Haven (born 1961)